This is a list of diplomatic missions in Tajikistan. The country has taken on more prominence in recent times due to its territory being used for basing and transit purposes during the War in Afghanistan against the Taliban.  At present, the capital of Dushanbe hosts 23 embassies.

Embassies
Dushanbe

Other posts
 (Delegation)

Consulates General
Kharogh

Khujand 
 (Consulate)

Non-resident embassies

 (Moscow)
 (Tashkent)
 (Islamabad)
 (Ashgabat)
 (Nur-Sultan)
  (Nur-Sultan)
 (Tehran)
 (Islamabad)
  (Nur-Sultan)
 (Ankara)
 (Tehran)
 (Moscow)
 (Moscow/New York City)
  (Nur-Sultan)
 (Moscow)
 (Ankara)
  (Nur-Sultan)
 (Moscow)
 (Tashkent)
 (Moscow)
 (Moscow)
 (Abu Dhabi)
 (Moscow)
 (Tashkent)
 (Nur-Sultan)
 (Helsinki)
 (Tashkent)
 (Moscow)
 (Seoul)
 (Nur-Sultan)
 (Seoul)
 (Tashkent)
 (Moscow)
 (Moscow)
 (Nur-Sultan)
 (Tehran)
 (Tashkent)
 (Tashkent)
 (Beijing)
 (Moscow)
 (Tashkent)
 (Tashkent)
  (Nur-Sultan)
 (Tashkent)
 (Moscow)
 (Nur-Sultan)
 (New Delhi)
 (Moscow)
 (New Delhi)
 (Tashkent)
 (Tehran)
  (Nur-Sultan)
  (Nur-Sultan)
 (Moscow)
  (Nur-Sultan)
 (Tehran)
 (Moscow)
 (Moscow)
 (Islamabad)
 (Tashkent)
 (Moscow)
 (Moscow)
 (Nur-Sultan)
 (Moscow)
 (Tashkent)
 (Moscow)
 (Nur-Sultan)
 (Nur-Sultan)
 (Islamabad)
 (Stockholm)
 (Tehran)
 (Nur-Sultan)
 (Tehran)
 (Moscow)
 (Moscow)
 (Nur-Sultan)
 (Ankara)
 (New Delhi)
 (New Delhi)
 (Moscow)
 (Nur-Sultan)
 (Moscow)
 (Tehran)
 (Tehran)
 (Moscow)
 (Islamabad)
 (Moscow)
 (Tehran)

See also
 Foreign relations of Tajikistan
 List of diplomatic missions of Tajikistan

References

External links
Missions in Tajikistan 
Diplomatic list

Diplomatic missions
Tajikistan
Diplomatic missions